KKDG (99.7 FM, "99X") is a commercial radio station that is licensed to Durango, Colorado and serves the Four Corners area. The station is currently owned by Winton Road Broadcasting Co, LLC and broadcasts a top 40 format.

History
The station was assigned the call letters KWXA on July 2, 1992. On April 10, 1998, the station became KPTE, then became the current KKDG on January 29, 2014.

References

External links

Contemporary hit radio stations in the United States
KDG